The Canon Court de 105 M(montagne) modèle 1909 Schneider (105 mm mle.1909) was a French mountain gun, manufactured by Schneider et Cie.  According to Kennblätter fremden Geräts, Germany used the former French gun as the 10.5 cm GebH 343(f). The gun could be towed by a horse or mule.

According to Russian sources the 105 M Mle 1909 was evaluated and found suitable for Russian use, but needed to be rebuilt to accept 107mm Russian ammunition and was never used by Russian army.  (Encyclopedia of the Soviet Artillery by Shirokorad A. B. and others).

Gallery

Notes

See also
Mountain artillery
List of mountain artillery

World War I mountain artillery of France
World War II weapons of France
World War II mountain artillery
Artillery of France
105 mm artillery
Schneider Electric